David or Dave Hancock may refer to:

 Sir David Hancock (civil servant) (1934–2013), British civil servant
 Dave Hancock (footballer) (1938–2007), English footballer
 David Hancock (cricketer) (born 1940), English cricketer
 Dave Hancock (American politician) (born 1945), member of the Minnesota House of Representatives
 Dave Hancock (weightlifter) (1945–1993), English weightlifter
 Dave Hancock (born 1955), Canadian politician and judge, former premier of Alberta
 W. David Hancock, American playwright